Laurie (Lee) McBain (born October 15, 1949) is a best-selling American writer of seven historical romance novels from 1975 to 1985.  Her novels Devil's Desire and Moonstruck Madness each sold over a million copies.

Biography
McBain was born in Riverside, California. She was educated at San Bernardino Valley College in California and studied at California State University. She was always passionate about art and history, so her father both encouraged her, and helped her to write her first historical romance. Her first book, Devil's Desire, was published in 1975 by Avon, joining her to a new generation of romantic writers, such as Kathleen E. Woodiwiss. Together they changed the style of the historical romance. Devil's Desire and her second novel Moonstruck Madness, each sold over a million copies.

After the death of her father, McBain decided to retire from the publishing world in 1985, with only seven romances written.

Bibliography

Single novels
Devil's Desire (1975)
Tears Of Gold (1979/Jun)
Wild Bells To The Wild Sky (1983)
When The Splendor Falls (1985)

Dominick Series
Moonstruck Madness (1977/Feb)
Chance The Winds Of Fortune (1980)
Dark Before The Rising Sun (1982)

References and sources

External links
Laurie McBain's Webpage in Fantastic Fiction's Website

1949 births
Writers from Riverside, California
Writers from California
American romantic fiction writers
20th-century American novelists
20th-century American women writers
Living people
Women romantic fiction writers
American women novelists
21st-century American women